Forbes Glacier may refer to:

 Forbes Glacier (Graham Land)
 Forbes Glacier (Mac. Robertson Land)
 Forbes Glacier (New Zealand)